Robert Braine (1896–1940) was an American composer.  A native of Ohio, he studied at the College of Music in Cincinnati.  He worked as a recital accompanist and as an organist; he also edited for a time, and was a staff pianist for NBC in New York City.  He composed three operas, Virginia, Diane, and The Eternal Light; he also wrote Top Hole, a musical comedy.  He composed a handful of chamber works and some orchestral pieces.  Of the latter, 1928's S.O.S. has been claimed as the first classical work written specifically for radio broadcast.

References

Review of Braine's S.O.S.

American male composers
American male organists
NBCUniversal people
1896 births
1940 deaths
20th-century American composers
20th-century American male musicians
American organists